Events in the year 1899 in India.

Incumbents
 Empress of India – Queen Victoria
 Viceroy of India – Victor Bruce, 9th Earl of Elgin
 Viceroy of India – George Curzon, 1st Marquess Curzon of Kedleston (from 6 January)

Events
 National income - 6,715 million
 Swami Vivekananda founded the Ramakrishna Mission at Calcutta on 1 May.
 31 December - The Sunset of the Century written by Rabindranath Tagore.

Law
 Indian Stamp Act
Government Buildings Act
Glanders and Farcy Act

Births
15 February – Mani Madhava Chakyar, master Chakyar Koothu and Koodiyattam artist (died 1990).
10 October – Baldev Upadhyaya, Sanskrit scholar, literary historian, essayist and critic (died 1999).

Full date unknown
Banaphool, author, playwright and poet (died 1979).

Deaths

References

 
India
Years of the 19th century in India